Broken Journey (also known as Rescue) is a 1948 British drama film directed by Ken Annakin and featuring Phyllis Calvert, James Donald, Margot Grahame, Raymond Huntley and Guy Rolfe. Broken Journey deals with people struggling to survive after their airliner crashes on top of a mountain, and is based on a true-life accident in the Swiss Alps.

Plot
In postwar Europe, while flying over the Swiss Alps, a Fox Airways Douglas DC-3 airliner experiences engine trouble and sends out a distress call. Pilot Captain Fox (Guy Rolfe) and co-pilot Bill Haverton (James Donald) set the aircraft down on a glacier with a minimum of damage, but know that they will not be able to radio for help with run-down batteries and a storm setting in.

Taking stock of their situation, Haverton knows he can rely on stewardess Mary Johnstone (Phyllis Calvert), who is in love with him, but some of the passengers present problems. Film star Joanna Dane (Margot Grahame), opera tenor Perami (Francis L. Sullivan) and iron lung patient John Barber (Grey Blake) are all, in different ways, difficult and demanding passengers. The wrecked aircraft provides them with shelter, as the 13 passengers and crew wait for rescue.

Rescue missions have already been mounted but, when a rescue aircraft misjudges its approach, it crashes and the crew are killed. With limited food supplies, the survivors realise that a rescue in the desolate location is unlikely. The survivors have to decide whether to stay and wait for help or leave the shelter of the wrecked airliner and set out in bad weather to try to reach safety. Some people make sacrifices to allow others to live.

Cast
 Phyllis Calvert as Mary Johnstone
 James Donald as Bill Haverton
 Margot Grahame as Joanna Dane
 Francis L. Sullivan as Perami
 Raymond Huntley as Edward Marshall
 Derek Bond as Richard Faber
 Guy Rolfe as Captain Fox
 David Tomlinson as Jimmy Marshall
 Sonia Holm as Anne Stephens
 Grey Blake as John Barber
 Sybille Binder as Lilli Romer
 Andrew Crawford as Kid Cormack
 Charles Victor as Harry Gunn
 Gerard Heinz as Joseph Romer
 Mary Hinton as Mrs. Barber

Production

Real Life Inspiration

The plot of Broken Journey closely approximated the 1946 C-53 Skytrooper crash on the Gauli Glacier, Switzerland in November 1946. The improvised operation that eventually resulted in the successful rescue of eight passengers and four crew members, considered the "birth of air-rescue in Switzerland", garnered worldwide publicity and led to the fictionalised account of Broken Journey.

Development
Sydney Box became head of production of Gainsborough Studios in 1946. He commissioned Robert Westerby, who had a reputation for writing contemporary thrillers, to do a script.  Michael Balcon was also developing a film based on the same story, and registered an idea with the British Producers Association, but once he heard Box was doing a film as well he withdrew his project.

Westerby did a treatment in six days, then proceeded to a full draft. He wrote a role specifically for Phyllis Calvert, then one of the studio's biggest stars. Calvert was reluctant to make the film but Box managed to persuade her.  It would be the last film Calvert made under her contract with Gainsborough.

The film was originally called Rescue.

Shooting
The film was shot over 14 weeks. Calvert was only available for half that time. There was location filming in Switzerland with studio work at Shepherd's Bush. Gainsborough had just finished making a film in the Alps called Snowbound (1947) so Annakin could draw on their expertise for the best locations.

Principal photography for the film took place in 1947. At the same time, Annakin was completing work on his second feature film, Miranda (1948).

Reception

Box office
Broken Journey was a commercial disappointment recording a loss of £63,900. This was attributed in part to the fact that the film came out 18 months after the accident which inspired it and was no longer topical.

Critical
Broken Journey was critically received as a disaster film. Reviewer A.W. Weiler of The New York Times observed that the film was effective; "... (an) intelligent script and a uniformly excellent cast serve to make the import a diverting entertainment. And, the rugged, spectacular mountain backgrounds are an added note of authenticity to the yarn which accents character study rather than melodramatics." The reviewer, however, had a caution that "..'Broken Journey', which might have been a top-flight, thoroughly exciting excursion, is simply a meticulously-planned trip in which the travellers are more interesting than the itinerary."

Steven H. Scheuer in Movies on TV, 1986–87 noted that the film was "tense, well acted melodrama."

References

Notes

Citations

Bibliography

 Scheuer, Steven H. Movies on TV, 1986–87.  New York: Bantam Books, 1986. .
 Spicer, Andrew .Sydney Box. Manchester, UK: Manchester University Press, 2006. .

External links
 
Review of film at Variety
 
 Broken Journey at the British Film Institute's Film and TV Database

1948 films
1948 drama films
British drama films
British aviation films
Films about aviation accidents or incidents
Films directed by Ken Annakin
Films set on airplanes
Gainsborough Pictures films
British black-and-white films
1940s English-language films
1940s British films